Dragonfly is a British television production company owned by Banijay subsidiary Endemol Shine UK. It has produced factual programmes for BBC One, BBC Two, BBC Three, BBC Four, ITV, Channel 4, Channel 5, Discovery Channel and National Geographic Channel.

History
The company was prominent in 2002, tested in 2003 and formed in 2004 and its output mainly consists of documentary series such as Kill It Cook It Eat It, The Hotel, World's Toughest Trucker, Beat The Ancestors and Tony Robinson's Crime and Punishment.

Its documentary for Channel 4 One Born Every Minute, based on a maternity ward, won the Best Factual Series BAFTA in 2010.

References

External links

Banijay
Mass media companies established in 2004
Television production companies of the United Kingdom